Toxic masculinity is a set of certain male behaviors associated with harm to society and men themselves. Traditional stereotypes of men as socially dominant, along with related traits such as misogyny and homophobia, can be considered "toxic" due in part to their promotion of violence, including sexual assault and domestic violence. The violent socialization of boys often normalizes violence, such as in the saying "boys will be boys" about bullying and aggression.

Self-reliance and emotional repression are correlated with increased psychological problems in men such as depression, increased stress, and substance use disorders. Toxic masculine traits are characteristic of the unspoken code of behavior among men in prisons, where they exist in part as a response to the harsh conditions of prison life.

Other traditionally masculine traits such as devotion to work, pride in excelling at sports, and providing for one's family, are not considered to be "toxic". The concept was originally used by authors associated with the mythopoetic men's movement, such as Shepherd Bliss. These authors contrasted stereotypical notions of masculinity with a "real" or "deep" masculinity, which they said men had lost touch with in modern society. Critics of the term toxic masculinity argue that it incorrectly implies that gender-related issues are caused by inherent male traits.

The concept of toxic masculinity, or certain formulations of it, has been criticized by some conservatives as an undue condemnation of traditional masculinity, and by some feminists as an essentialist concept that ignores the role of choice and context in causing harmful behaviors and attitudes related to masculinity.

Terminology
The term toxic masculinity originated in the mythopoetic men's movement of the 1980s and 1990s. It later found wide use in both academic and popular writing. Popular and media discussions in the 2010s have used the term to refer to traditional and stereotypical norms of masculinity and manhood. According to the sociologist Michael Flood, these include "expectations that boys and men must be active, aggressive, tough, daring, and dominant".

Mythopoetic movement
Some authors associated with the mythopoetic men's movement have referred to the social pressures placed upon men to be violent, competitive, independent, and unfeeling as a "toxic" form of masculinity, in contrast to a "real" or "deep" masculinity that they say men have lost touch within modern society. The academic Shepherd Bliss proposed a return to agrarianism as an alternative to the "potentially toxic masculinity" of the warrior ethic. Sociologist Michael Kimmel writes that Bliss's notion of toxic masculinity can be seen as part of the mythopoetic movement's response to male feelings of powerlessness at a time when the feminist movement was challenging traditional male authority:

Academic usage
In the social sciences, toxic masculinity refers to traditional cultural masculine norms that can be harmful to men, women, and society overall. This concept of toxic masculinity does not condemn men or male attributes, but rather emphasizes the harmful effects of conformity to certain traditional masculine ideal behaviors such as dominance, self-reliance, and competition. Toxic masculinity is thus defined by adherence to traditional male gender roles that consequently stigmatize and limit the emotions boys and men may comfortably express while elevating other emotions such as anger. It is marked by economic, political, and social expectations that men seek and achieve dominance.

In a gender studies context, Raewyn Connell refers to toxic practices that may arise out of what she terms hegemonic masculinity, rather than essential traits. Connell argues that such practices, such as physical violence, may serve to reinforce men's dominance over women in Western societies. She stresses that such practices are a salient feature of hegemonic masculinity, although not always the defining features.

Terry Kupers describes toxic masculinity as involving "the need to aggressively compete and dominate others", and as "the constellation of socially regressive male traits that serve to foster domination, the devaluation of women, homophobia and wanton violence". According to Kupers, toxic masculinity includes aspects of "hegemonic masculinity" that are socially destructive, "such as misogyny, homophobia, greed, and violent domination". He contrasts these traits with more positive traits such as "pride in [one's] ability to win at sports, to maintain solidarity with a friend, to succeed at work, or to provide for [one's] family". Feminist author John Stoltenberg has argued that all traditional notions of masculinity are toxic and reinforce the oppression of women.

Gender norms

According to Kupers, toxic masculine norms are a feature of life for men in American prisons, where they are reflected in the behavior of both staff and inmates. The qualities of extreme self-reliance, domination of other men through violence, and avoiding the appearance of either femininity or weakness, comprise an unspoken code among prisoners. Suppressing vulnerable emotions is often adopted to successfully cope with the harsh conditions of prison life, defined by punishment, social isolation, and aggression. These factors likely play a role in suicide among male prisoners.

Toxic masculinity can also take the form of bullying of boys by their peers and domestic violence directed toward boys at home. The often violent socialization of boys produces psychological trauma through the promotion of aggression and lack of interpersonal connection. Such trauma is often disregarded, such as in the saying "boys will be boys" about bullying. The promotion of idealized masculine roles emphasizing toughness, dominance, self-reliance, and the restriction of emotion can begin as early as infancy. Such norms are transmitted by parents, other male relatives, and members of the community. Media representations of masculinity on websites such as YouTube often promote similar stereotypical gender roles.

According to Ronald F. Levant and others, traditionally prescribed masculine behaviors can produce harmful effects including violence (including sexual assault and domestic violence), promiscuity, risky and/or socially irresponsible behaviors including substance use disorders, and dysfunction in relationships.

Health effects
The American Psychological Association has warned that "traditional masculinity ideology" is associated with negative effects on mental and physical health. Men who adhere to traditionally masculine cultural norms, such as risk-taking, violence, dominance, the primacy of work, need for emotional control, desire to win, and pursuit of social status, tend to be more likely to experience psychological problems such as depression, stress, body image problems, substance use, and poor social functioning. The effect tends to be stronger in men who also emphasize "toxic" masculine norms, such as self-reliance, seeking power over women, and sexual promiscuity or "playboy" behavior. The APA guidelines were criticized by the British Psychological Society in a 2022 practice briefing on psychological intervention for men, which argued that the concept of toxic masculinity may damage the therapeutic alliance, discourage men seeking therapy, and contribute to the misdiagnosis of trauma. 

The social value of self-reliance has diminished over time as modern American society has moved more toward interdependence. Both self-reliance and the stifling of emotional expression can work against mental health, as they make it less likely for men to seek psychological help or to possess the ability to deal with difficult emotions. Preliminary research suggests that cultural pressure for men to be stoic and self-reliant may also shorten men's lifespans by causing them to be less likely to discuss health problems with their physicians.

Toxic masculinity is also implicated in socially-created public health problems, such as elevated rates of alcoholism and certain types of cancer among men, or the role of "trophy-hunting" sexual behavior in rates of transmission of HIV and other sexually transmitted infections.

Psychiatrist Frank Pittman wrote about how men are harmed by traditional masculine norms, suggesting this includes shorter lifespans, greater incidence of violent death, and ailments such as lung cancer and cirrhosis of the liver.

Criticism 
Some conservatives, as well as many in the alt-right, see toxic masculinity as an incoherent concept or believe that there is no such thing as toxic masculinity. In January 2019, conservative political commentators criticized the new American Psychological Association guidelines for warning about harms associated with "traditional masculinity ideology", arguing that it constitutes an attack on masculinity. APA chief of professional practice Jared Skillings responded to conservative criticism, stating that the report's discussion of traditional masculinity is about "negative traits such as violence or over-competitiveness or being unwilling to admit weakness" and noting that the report also discusses positive traits traditionally associated with masculinity such as "courage, leadership, protectiveness".

See also
 Bad boy archetype
 Machismo
 Male privilege
 Patriarchy
 Sexism
Internalized Sexism

References

Further reading

Academic sources

Popular press
 
 
 
 
 
 
 
 
 
 
 
 

Masculinity
Men and feminism
Men's health
Men's movement
Social concepts